Tommaso Boni (born 15 January 1993) is an Italian rugby union player. His usual position is as a centre and he currently plays for Zebre.

In 2012 and 2013 Boni was named in the Italy Under 20 squad and in 2014 he was part of Emerging Italy squad.

In 2016 he was also named in the Italy squad.

References

External links
Zebre Profile
Pro12 Profile
It's Rugby England Profile

1993 births
Living people
Italian rugby union players
Italy international rugby union players
Rugby union centres
Zebre Parma players
Sportspeople from Venice
Mogliano Rugby players
People from Mestre-Carpenedo